Eric Ebron (born April 10, 1993) is an American football tight end who is a free agent. He played college football at North Carolina, and was drafted by the Detroit Lions in the first round of the 2014 NFL Draft. He has also previously played for the Indianapolis Colts and Pittsburgh Steelers.

Early years
Ebron first attended North Providence High School in Rhode Island. He played football for the North Providence Jets. He later moved to North Carolina, where he attended Ben L. Smith High School in Greensboro. He played both tight end and defensive end while at Ben L. Smith High School. He had 28 receptions for 682 yards and 10 touchdowns on offense and 68 tackles and 13.5 sacks on defense.

Considered a three-star recruit by Rivals.com, Ebron was rated as the 21st best tight end prospect of his class.

College career

Ebron attended the University of North Carolina from 2011 to 2013. As a true freshman in 2011, Ebron played in 10 games, recording 10 receptions for 207 yards and a touchdown. As a sophomore in 2012, he started in all 11 games, recording 40 receptions for 625 yards and four touchdowns. The receptions and receiving yards were a North Carolina record for tight ends. As a junior in 2013, Ebron caught 62 passes for 973 yards and three touchdowns, and was a first-team All-Atlantic Coast Conference (ACC) selection. He was also chosen as a finalist for the John Mackey Award, given to the nation's top tight end.

On November 25, 2013, Ebron announced his intentions to forgo his remaining eligibility and enter the 2014 NFL Draft.

Collegiate statistics

Professional career
On November 25, 2013, it was announced through Ebron had decided to forgo his remaining eligibility and enter the 2014 NFL Draft. Ebron attended the NFL Scouting Combine in Indianapolis and completed the majority of drills, but opted to skip the short shuttle and three-cone drill after sustaining a minor injury. He ran the second fastest time in the 40-yard dash among all tight ends participating at the NFL Combine, finishing only behind Tennessee State tight end A. C. Leonard (4.50s). 

On March 25, 2014, Ebron participated at North Carolina’s pro day, but elected to stand on his combine numbers and only performed the short shuttle, three-cone drill, and positional drills. During positional drills, Ebron dropped three passes from quarterback Bryn Renner. Multiple NFL draft experts stated Ebron looked poor in his positional drills and highlighted the drops as a cause for concern. Ebron attended pre-draft visits with multiple teams, including the Baltimore Ravens, Buffalo Bills, Detroit Lions, and Carolina Panthers. At the conclusion of the pre-draft process, Ebron was projected to be among the first 20 players selected by NFL draft experts and scouts. He was ranked as the top tight end prospect in the draft by DraftScout.com, NFL analyst Bucky Brooks, NFL analyst Mike Mayock, and Sports Illustrated.

Detroit Lions
The Detroit Lions selected Ebron in the first round (10th overall) of the 2014 NFL Draft. Ebron was the first tight end drafted and became the eighth highest selection from North Carolina in school history. He also became the highest tight end to be drafted by the Detroit Lions in franchise history, surpassing David Lewis (20th overall, 1985) and Brandon Pettigrew (20th overall, 2009), although he has since been supplanted by T. J. Hockenson (8th overall, 2019)

2014
On June 13, 2014, the Detroit Lions signed Ebron to a fully guaranteed four-year, $12.49 million contract that includes a signing bonus of $7.22 million.

Throughout training camp, Ebron competed to be a starting tight end against Brandon Pettigrew and Joseph Fauria. Head coach Jim Caldwell named Ebron the third tight end on the depth chart, behind Pettigrew and Fauria, to begin the regular season.

He made his professional regular season debut in the Detroit Lions’ season-opening 35–14 victory against the New York Giants. In Week 2, he caught three passes for a season-high 38 yards during a 24–7 loss against the Carolina Panthers. On September 28, 2014, Ebron made three receptions for 34-yards and caught his first career touchdown during a 24–17 win at the New York Jets in Week 4. Ebron caught his first career touchdown on a 16-yard pass from quarterback Matthew Stafford during the second quarter. Ebron was sidelined for three games (Weeks 7–9) due to a hamstring injury. He finished his rookie season in 2014 with 25 receptions for 248 receiving yards and one touchdown in 13 games and seven starts.

2015
He entered training camp in 2015 as the No. 2 tight end on the depth chart. Head coach Jim Caldwell retained Ebron as the backup tight end to Brandon Pettigrew to start the regular season. On September 20, 2015, Ebron caught a season-high five passes for 43-yards and a touchdown during a 26–16 loss at the Minnesota Vikings in a Week 2. Ebron sustained a hamstring injury during a Week 4 loss at the Seattle Seahawks and was inactive for the next two games (Weeks 5–6). In Week 7, Ebron recorded five receptions for a season-high 89 receiving yards and one touchdown during a 28–19 loss against the Minnesota Vikings. On October 26, 2015, the Detroit Lions fired offensive coordinator Joe Lombardi. He finished the 2015 NFL season with 47 receptions for 537 receiving yards and five touchdowns in 14 games and eight starts.

2016
Ebron entered the regular season as the No. 1 tight end on the Lions depth chart. He replaced Brandon Pettigrew who was placed on the physically unable to perform list after tearing his ACL the previous season. In Week 4, Ebron suffered injuries to his knee and ankle during a 17–14 loss at the Chicago Bears and was subsequently sidelined for the next three games (Weeks 5–7). On November 20, 2016, Ebron made three catches for 70-yards and scored his first career rushing touchdown on a one-yard carry during the fourth quarter of a 26–19 win against the Jacksonville Jaguars in Week 11. In Week 16, he made a season-high eight receptions for 93-yards as the Lions lost 42–21 at the Dallas Cowboys. Ebron finished the 2016 NFL season with 61 receptions for 711 receiving yards and one touchdown in 13 games and 13 starts.

On January 7, 2017, Ebron started in his first career playoff game in the Wild Card Round, catching two passes for 23 yards as the Lions lost to the Seattle Seahawks by 26-6.

2017

On May 2, 2017, the Detroit Lions exercised the fifth-year option on Ebron’s rookie contract. The $8.25 million option kept Ebron under contract throughout the 2018 NFL season. Head coach Jim Caldwell retained Ebron as the No. 1 tight end after the departure of Brandon Pettigrew. On December 10, 2017, Ebron caught a season-high ten passes for 94-yards during a 24–21 victory at the Tampa Bay Buccaneers in Week 14. He finished the season with 53 receptions for 574 receiving yards and four touchdowns in 16 games and nine starts.

2018
On March 14, 2018, the Detroit Lions released Ebron.

Ebron met with the Indianapolis Colts and Carolina Panthers during free agency.

Indianapolis Colts

2018

On March 19, 2018, the Indianapolis Colts signed Ebron to a two-year, $13 million contract that includes $6.50 million guaranteed. Head coach Frank Reich named Ebron the backup tight end, behind Jack Doyle, to begin the regular season. Ebron became the primary starting tight end after Jack Doyle sustained a hip injury in Week 2 and was sidelined for the next five games (Weeks 3-7).

On October 10, 2018, Ebron recorded nine receptions for a career-high 105 receiving yards and two receiving touchdowns during a 38–24 loss at the New England Patriots in a Week 5. On November 11, 2018, Ebron caught three passes for 69-yards and two touchdown receptions and also had a two-yard rushing touchdown during a 29–26 victory against the Jacksonville Jaguars in Week 11. In Week 12, Ebron caught five passes for 45 receiving yards and two touchdowns. As a result of those two touchdowns, he passed Dallas Clark for most receiving touchdown in a single season by a Colts tight end. The Colts defeated the Miami Dolphins 27–24. The following game, Ebron returned to his role as the ‘’de facto’’ starting tight end after Jack Doyle sustained a kidney injury and was placed on injured-reserve for the remainder of the season on November 26, 2018. On December 2, 2018, he made a season-high ten receptions for 81-yards during a 6–0 loss at the Jacksonville Jaguars in Week 13. On December 18, 2018, it was announced that Ebron was selected to play in the 2019 Pro Bowl, marking the first Pro Bowl selection of his career. He finished his first season with the Indianapolis Colts in 2018 with 66 receptions for 750 receiving yards and 13 touchdown receptions in 16 games and eight starts. Ebron recorded career highs in receptions, receiving yards, and receiving touchdowns in 2018 and led all tight ends with 13 touchdown receptions. His 13 touchdown receptions tied Green Bay Packers wide receiver Davante Adams as the second most among all players, behind Pittsburgh Steelers’ Antonio Brown (15 touchdowns). He received an overall grade of 68.7 from Pro Football Focus, which ranked 23rd among all qualifying tight ends in 2018.

The Indianapolis Colts finished second in the AFC South with a 10–6 record and earned a Wild Card Round berth. On January 5, 2019, Ebron started in his first playoff game for the Colts and caught three passes for 26 yards and scored one touchdown in the 21–7 win over the Houston Texans in the AFC Wild Card Round. He was ranked 66th by his fellow players on the NFL Top 100 Players of 2019.

2019
Head coach Frank Reich named Ebron and Jack Doyle the starting tight ends to start the season with Doyle serving as the primary starter. In Week 7 against the Houston Texans, Ebron caught four receptions for 70 yards, and one touchdown in a 30-23 win. On November 25, 2019, Ebron was placed on season-ending injured reserve with an ankle injury. Overall, Ebron finished the 2019 season with 31 receptions for 375 receiving yards and three receiving touchdowns.

Pittsburgh Steelers
On March 30, 2020, Ebron signed a two-year, $12 million contract with the Pittsburgh Steelers. In Week 3 against the Houston Texans, Ebron caught 5 passes for 52 yards and his first receiving touchdown as a Steeler during the 28–21 win. He was placed on the reserve/COVID-19 list by the team on January 2, 2021, and activated five days later. Ebron finished the 2020 season with 56 receptions for 558 receiving yards and five receiving touchdowns. In the Wild Card Round of the playoffs against the Cleveland Browns, Ebron recorded seven catches for 62 yards and a touchdown during the 48–37 loss. 

Ebron entered the 2021 season as the Steelers starting tight end. He was soon passed on the depth chart by rookie Pat Freiermuth. He was placed on injured reserve on November 27, 2021. He played in eight games and recorded 12 receptions for 84 receiving yards and a receiving touchdown in the 2021 season.

NFL career statistics

References

External links

 
 North Carolina Tar Heels bio

1993 births
Living people
American football tight ends
Detroit Lions players
Indianapolis Colts players
North Carolina Tar Heels football players
Pittsburgh Steelers players
Players of American football from Greensboro, North Carolina
American Conference Pro Bowl players